The Lady Clare may refer to:

 The Lady Clare (1919 film), a 1919 British silent film.
 Lady Clare, an 1842 poem by Alfred Tennyson.
 "Lady Clara Vere de Vere", another 1842 poem by Alfred Tennyson.